Souttar may refer to:

 Harry Souttar (born 1998), Scottish-born Australian footballer
 Henry Souttar (1875–1964), British surgeon 
 John Souttar (born 1996), Scottish professional footballer
 James Souttar (1840–1922), Scottish architect
 Robinson Souttar (1848–1912), British Liberal Party politician

See also
Soutar

Occupational surnames
English-language surnames